The Garden Dreams Project is a conservation and tourism network concerned with rediscovering the cultural heritage of gardens in the German state of Saxony-Anhalt.
Historical parks which had been, to an extent, forgotten are opened up to a wide audience. The beginnings of the project date back to 1999.
Forty parks of varying character across the state of Saxony-Anhalt belong to the network. These include the Elbaue Park in Magdeburg, the former "Accommodation of Romanticism" Reichardt's Garden in Halle (Saale), the Europa Rosarium in Sangerhausen, the maze in Altjeßnitz and the Castle and Park at Dieskau.
Since the beginning of 2006, the "garden dreams" have been marketed using their own logo.

Sources 
 Ludwig Schumann: Besondere Parks & Gärten in Sachsen-Anhalt. Buchverlag für die Frau, Leipzig 2006; .

External links 

 Website of the Garden Dreams project 

Culture of Saxony-Anhalt
Gardens in Saxony-Anhalt
Cultural organisations based in Germany